Bajaj may refer to:

People
Bajaj (surname)

Companies
 Bajaj Group, a group of Indian firms in diverse businesses founded by Jamnalal Bajaj
 Bajaj Auto, a manufacturer of two and three wheelers in India, Indonesia and South America, part of the Bajaj group
 Bajaj Tempo, former name of Force Motors, a manufacturer of light trucks in India

Products
 An auto rickshaw (three-wheeler), generically known as "Bajaj" after the Bajaj Auto company manufacturing such cars 
 Daihatsu Midget, a single-seat mini-truck also marketed under the name Bajaj

Other uses
 The Jamnalal Bajaj Institute of Management Studies, a Business school in Mumbai, India